

Populated places
Khani is the name of several inhabited localities in Russia.

Urban localities
Khani, Sakha Republic, an urban-type settlement in Neryungrinsky District of the Sakha Republic

Rural localities
Khani, Novgorod Oblast, a village in Yamnikskoye Settlement of Demyansky District in Novgorod Oblast

Other
Khani (river), a left tributary of the Olyokma